The Great Divide is the eighth studio album by the American progressive metal band Enchant. It was released 11 years after their previous studio album, Tug of War.

Track listing 
 "Circles" (Ott, Jenkins, Platt, Flanegan) – 7:59
 "Within an Inch" (Ott, Leonard) – 7:34
 "The Great Divide" (Ott, Jenkins, Platt, Flanegan) – 9:05
 "All Mixed Up" (Leonard) – 4:12
 "Transparent Man" (Ott) – 6:20
 "Life in a Shadow" (Leonard) – 5:00
 "Deserve to Feel" (Ott, Leonard, Jenkins, Platt, Flanegan) – 8:01
 "Here and Now" (Platt, Jenkins, Ott) – 7:33
 "Prognosticator" (Special Edition bonus track) (Ott, Jenkins, Platt, Flanegan) – 8:22

Personnel 
 Sean Flanegan – drums, percussion
 Bill Jenkins – keyboards
 Ted Leonard – guitar, vocals
 Douglas A. Ott – guitar, vocals
 Ed Platt – bass guitar

Production 
 Jennifer Huls, James E. Ott  – photography
 Thomas Ewerhard – design, layout design
 Tom Size – mixing
 Peter Van 'T Riet – mastering

References

2014 albums
Enchant (band) albums